Byttneria loxensis is a species of flowering plant in the family Malvaceae. It is found only in Ecuador. Its natural habitat is subtropical or tropical dry shrubland.

References

loxensis
Endemic flora of Ecuador
Endangered plants
Taxonomy articles created by Polbot